Leucadendron sorocephalodes, the woolly conebush, is a flower-bearing shrub belonging to the genus Leucadendron and forms part of the fynbos. The plant is native to the Western Cape and Eastern Cape where it occurs from the Outeniqua Mountains to the Baviaanskloof Mountains.

The shrub grows only 30 cm high but 2 m wide and flowers in August. The plant dies after a fire but the seeds survive. The seeds are stored in a toll on the female plant and fall out of the toll soil after two months where they are spread by ants. The plant is unisexual and there are separate plants with male and female flowers, which are pollinated by insects. The plant grows in sandstone rocks and stones at altitudes of 1 300-1 700 m.

In Afrikaans it is known as Wollerige tolbos.

References 

 http://redlist.sanbi.org/species.php?species=794-129
 http://biodiversityexplorer.info/plants/proteaceae/leucadendron_sorocephalodes.htm
 https://www.proteaatlas.org.za/conebu13.htm

sorocephalodes